Čretvež is a small settlement in the Municipality of Zreče in northeastern Slovenia. It lies in the hills south of Zreče and west of Slovenske Konjice. The area is part of the traditional region of Styria. It is now included with the rest of the municipality in the Savinja Statistical Region.

References

External links
Čretvež at Geopedia

Populated places in the Municipality of Zreče